Bellevue Towers is a high rise condominium complex in downtown Bellevue, Washington. Construction began in 2006 and was completed in 2009. The 42 and 43 story towers have 539 condo units,  of retail space, and eight levels of underground parking. The project is 85% sold as of January 2013. Bellevue Towers stands on a  site.

Bellevue Towers is the largest Leadership in Energy and Environmental Design (LEED) Gold certified residential development in the Pacific Northwest with its energy-efficient glass facade, low-flow plumbing fixtures, dual-flush toilets, rooftop garden between the towers, and efficient condensing boiler. The $436 million project was developed by Gerding Edlen and built by Hoffman Construction Company. The project was not a financial success: Gerding Edlen could not pay off its loans, and had to turn the project over to their lender in 2011.

See also
List of tallest buildings in Bellevue, Washington

Notes and references

External links

Bellevue Towers Official Website

 

 
 

Skyscrapers in Bellevue, Washington
Residential buildings completed in 2009
Twin towers
Residential skyscrapers in Washington (state)
2009 establishments in Washington (state)